Gianguido D'Alberto (born 31 March 1977 in Cosenza) is an Italian politician.

D'Alberto ran as an independent for the office of Mayor of Teramo at the 2018 Italian local elections, supported by a centre-left coalition. He won and took office on 28 June 2018.

See also
2018 Italian local elections
List of mayors of Teramo

References

External links
 

1977 births
Living people
Mayors of Teramo